Centauros del pasado is a 1944 Argentine historical biopic film directed by , with a screenplay by Villar, Eliseo Montaine, and , as based upon the original historical novel by Montaine and Talice about Pancho Ramirez, a governor of Argentina's Entre Ríos Province during the Argentine War of Independence, and founder of the Republic of Entre Ríos.

Plot
During the Argentine War of Independence, Pancho Ramirez led well-disciplined and successful forces against the Royalists, eventually founding the short-lived Republic of Entre Ríos in 1820. When opposition forces captured his wife in 1821, Ramirez was killed and beheaded during an ill-fated attempt at rescue.

Cast

 Nelo Cosimi
 Santiago Gómez Cou
 Pedro Maratea
 Alita Román
 Domingo Sapelli
 Froilán Varela
 Ernesto Vilches
 Eloy Álvarez
 
 
 
 Nelly Edison
 César Fiaschi
 Anita Jordán
 
 
 
 Juan Pérez Bilbao

Accolades
In 1945, The Argentine Film Critics Association awarded  and Eliseo Montaine the Silver Condor Award for Best Original Screenplay.

References

External links
 
 Centauros del pasado at Cinenacional (Spanish)

1944 films
1940s Spanish-language films
Argentine black-and-white films
Argentine historical films
Films directed by Belisario García Villar
1940s historical films
1940s Argentine films